is a Japanese professional baseball outfielder and first baseman in the Texas Rangers organization. He has played in Major League Baseball (MLB) for the Tampa Bay Rays, Los Angeles Dodgers and Pittsburgh Pirates and for the Yokohama BayStars/Yokohama DeNA BayStars of Nippon Professional Baseball (NPB). He was the youngest player in BayStars franchise history to reach 100, 150, and 200 home runs. On July 22, 2016, Tsutsugo became the first player in Nippon Professional Baseball history to have three straight multiple home run games, and in the same month he also became the first to have six multiple home run games in a month.

Professional career

Yokohama BayStars (2010–2019) 

Tsutsugo made his rookie debut at age 18 for the Yokohama BayStars and played 3 games in 2010. He played 40 games in 2011, 108 games in 2012 and 23 games in 2013. His slow start were caused by injuries and lack of experience using wooden bats in professional baseball. He became a regular on the team in the 2014 season and played in 114 games. He hit 22 home runs, drove in 77 RBIs, and hit .300 with an OBP of .373. In 2015, he was selected to his first NPB All-Star Game. He hit 24 home runs, drove in 95 runs, and hit .309 with an OBP of .395.

In 2016, he was selected to his second consecutive NPB All-Star Game and was the All-Star Game MVP.  He led with Central League in home runs (44) and RBIs (110).  He also had career highs in batting average (.322) and OBP (.430). Tsutsugo was selected to the next three NPB All-Star Games, winning the Kantosho (敢闘選手賞) or "Fighting Spirit Award" in all three appearances. In total, Tsutsugo appeared in five NPB All-Star Games from 2015 to 2019.

In January 2019, Tsutsugo gave a speech at the Foreign correspondents club of Japan where he criticized the harsh regimentation and focus on tournaments in youth baseball in Japan. In addition he stated that he would like to play in Major League Baseball in the future. After the 2019 season, on November 15, 2019, BayStars announced it was allowing Tsutsugo to enter the posting system to play in Major League Baseball (MLB).

Tampa Bay Rays 
On December 16, 2019, Tsutsugo signed a two-year, $12 million contract with the Tampa Bay Rays of Major League Baseball. On March 25, 2020, he returned to Japan due to the COVID-19 pandemic.

On July 24, 2020, Tsutsugo was the starting third baseman, making his MLB debut on Opening Day against the Toronto Blue Jays. That day, he recorded his first MLB hit, a home run off of Hyun-jin Ryu. He finished the season hitting .197/.314/.395 with 8 home runs and 24 RBIs in 51 games.

On May 11, 2021, Tsutsugo was designated for assignment by the Rays after hitting .167 in 87 plate appearances.

Los Angeles Dodgers
On May 15, 2021, Tsutsugo was traded to the Los Angeles Dodgers in exchange for cash considerations or a player to be named later. He made his Dodgers debut on May 18 as the starting left fielder against the Arizona Diamondbacks. In 12 games with the Dodgers, Tsutsugo had three hits in 25 at-bats (.120 average) before being placed on the injured list with a right calf strain. On July 7, he was passed through waivers and sent outright to the Triple-A Oklahoma City Dodgers. On August 14, the Dodgers released Tsutsugo.

Pittsburgh Pirates
On August 16, 2021, he signed a major league contract with the Pittsburgh Pirates, and played his first game with the team on the same day. On November 24, 2021, he agreed to a one year contract with the Pirates for $4 million. On August 3, 2022, Tsutsugo was designated for assignment. He was released on August 5.

Toronto Blue Jays
On August 15, 2022, Tsutsugo signed a minor league deal with the Toronto Blue Jays organization. Tsutsugo was assigned to the Triple-A Buffalo Bisons, where he hit .265/.381/.459 with 5 home runs and 18 RBI. He elected free agency on November 10, 2022.

Texas Rangers
On January 15, 2023, Tsutsugo signed a minor league contract with the Texas Rangers organization.

International career
Tsutsugo played for Japan national baseball team in the 2017 World Baseball Classic. Tsutsugo was named the Pool B Most Valuable Player after batting .364.

On August 20, 2018, he was selected for the 2018 MLB Japan All-Star Series, but on October 26, 2018, he canceled his participation for Samurai Japan.

Playing style 
Tsutsugo was a switch hitter throughout his amateur school career until Yokohama High School, where he became a left-handed hitter due to a discovery of a herniated disc during medical examination.

See also
 List of Major League Baseball players from Japan

References

External links

NPB.jp

1991 births
Living people
Baseball people from Wakayama Prefecture
Buffalo Bisons (minor league) players
Japanese expatriate baseball players in the United States
Leones del Escogido players
Japanese expatriate baseball players in the Dominican Republic
Los Angeles Dodgers players
National baseball team players
Nippon Professional Baseball first basemen
Nippon Professional Baseball left fielders
Nippon Professional Baseball right fielders
Nippon Professional Baseball third basemen
Major League Baseball first basemen
Major League Baseball left fielders
Major League Baseball players from Japan
Major League Baseball third basemen
Oklahoma City Dodgers players
People from Hashimoto, Wakayama
Pittsburgh Pirates players
Tampa Bay Rays players
Yokohama BayStars players
Yokohama DeNA BayStars players
2015 WBSC Premier12 players
2017 World Baseball Classic players